Jasnath Temple is a temple of Lord Jasnath  situated in Katriyasar village in the Bikaner district of Rajasthan. It is 45 km from Junagarh Fort in Bikaner District.

History
This is the main Dham (meaning: abode) of Jasnath sect. Jasnath ji Maharaj, while taking samadhi, ordered Haroji to establish Dharmapeeth, propagating Dharma sect. Fire Dance (Hindi: Agni Nritya) of Jasnathi Siddh community is very famous.

See also
Sidh (community)

References

External links
Yogic fire dance gaining popularity Times of India
https://zeenews.india.com/hindi/india/rajasthan/video/cm-vasundhara-raje-is-on-the-2-day-visit-of-bikaner/424935/amp
https://www.patrika.com/bikaner-news/five-day-qatariasar-mela-1845482/
http://m.samaylive.com/news-diffrent/149586/superstition-devotion-fire-dance-video.html
https://www.dnaindia.com/jaipur/report-cm-vasundhara-raje-inaugurates-19-panoramas-in-rajasthan-2668867

Temples
Hindu temples in Rajasthan
Tourist attractions in Bikaner district
Tourist attractions in Bikaner
Temples in Rajasthan